That Old Feeling is the third album led by pianist Albert Dailey which was recorded in 1978 and released on the SteepleChase label.

Track listing
 "Music That Makes Me Dance" (Jule Styne) – 7:47
 "Lover Man" (Jimmy Davis, Roger "Ram" Ramirez, James Sherman) – 4:39
 "Yesterdays" (Jerome Kern, Otto Harbach) – 10:48
 "Michelle" (John Lennon, Paul McCartney) – 5:23
 "That Old Feeling" (Sammy Fain, Lew Brown) – 11:33
 "Body and Soul" (Johnny Green, Frank Eyton, Edward Heyman, Robert Sour) – 6:53
 "Night and Day" (Cole Porter) – 8:05

Personnel
Albert Dailey – piano
Buster Williams – bass
Billy Hart – drums

References

SteepleChase Records albums
Albert Dailey albums
1979 albums